Cryphia petrea is a moth of the family Noctuidae. It is found from Spain through North Africa to the Near East and Middle East. In the Levant it is found in Lebanon, Jordan and Israel.

Adults are on wing in August in Israel. There is one generation per year.

The larvae probably feed on lichen.

Subspecies
Cryphia petrea petrea
Cryphia petrea contristans (Lebanon, Jordan, Israel)

External links

Bryophila (Moureia) petrea Guenée, 1852 on Fauna Europaea
Bryophila petrea Guenée, 1852 on Lepiforum.de

Cryphia
Moths of Europe
Moths of the Middle East
Taxa named by Achille Guenée
Moths described in 1852